Ludgvan was an electoral division of Cornwall in the United Kingdom which returned one member to sit on Cornwall Council between 2009 and 2021. It was abolished at the 2021 local elections, being split between Ludgvan, Madron, Gulval and Heamoor, Long Rock, Marazion and St Erth, St Ives East, Lelant and Carbis Bay, and St Ives West and Towednack.

The same name was also used for a division of Cornwall Council between 1973 and 2009 which returned one member, and a division of Penwith District Council which returned 3 members between 1973 and 2004.

Cornwall Council division

Extent
Ludgvan covered the villages of Long Rock, Crowlas, Morvah, Zennor and Ludgvan, and the hamlets of Vellanoweth, Cockwells, Whitecross, Lelant Downs, Carfury, Mulfra, Boskednan, Tredinneck, Lower Ninnes, Trevowhan, Rosemergy, Treen, Trewey and Boswednack. The village of Nancledra and the hamlet of Cripplesease were shared with the St Ives West division and the hamlets of Rose-an-Grouse and Canon's Town were shared with the Gwinear-Gwithian and St Erth division.

The division was redistricted during boundary changes at the 2013 election. From 2009 to 2013, the division covered 6113 hectares; after boundary changes in 2013 it covered 6624 hectares.

Councillors

Election results

2017 election

2013 election

2009 election

Penwith District Council

Councillors

References

Electoral divisions of Cornwall Council